The seventh European Parliament was elected in the 2009 elections and lasted until the 2014 elections.

Major events

 4–7 June 2009
 Elections to the Seventh Parliament.
 14 July 2009
 First meeting (constitutive session) of the Seventh Parliament.
 Jerzy Buzek is elected as President of the European Parliament.
 Vice-presidents elections.
 17 January 2012
 Martin Schulz is elected as President of the European Parliament.

Activity

Major resolutions and positions

Committees

Summary

Temporary committees

Committees of enquiry

Delegations

Political groups

See membership below for details of size

Members in groups by country

Leadership

Presidents

Vice-Presidents

Quaestors

Membership

After the 2009 election, the members formed seven groups with around 26 independent members, mainly from the far right which failed to unify into a political group. With the Treaty of Lisbon not in force in time for the elections, the national distribution followed the rules of the Treaty of Nice which necessitated a reduction to 736 members. Extra members will join the chamber if Lisbon comes into force.

The seventh parliament ended with a total of 766 MEPs (including Croatia) and was slimmed down to 751 at the start of the eight parliament.

For the seventh parliament, the number of women increased from 31% to 35% (the highest to date, from 16% in 1979) with increases in most countries. The largest percentage was in Sweden, with 56% of MEPs women, followed by Estonia with 50%. The lowest was Malta with no women members at all, followed by the Czech Republic with 18%, down from 21%.

From inauguration, the youngest member was Emilie Turunen of Denmark (born in 1984 making her 25) and the oldest member was Ciriaco de Mita of Italy (born 1928 making him 81). Usually the oldest member would preside over the chamber for the election of the Parliament's president. However, with concern that the far-right Jean-Marie Le Pen would be the oldest member (rather than De Mita) the rules were changed to give this role to the outgoing President.

Groups

 Edward McMillan-Scott was expelled from the Conservative Party on 15 September 2009; 
 Nikki Sinclaire was expelled from the UK Independence Party on 4 March 2010. 
 Edward McMillan-Scott joined Liberal Democrats on 12 March 2010.

 Mike Nattrass left UK Independence Party on 23 June 2010.

Apportionment

Secretariat

See also

Elections

Membership lists

Notes

References

External links
European Parliament
Explanation of codecision
European Parliament positions
European Parliament and European Council common positions
European Parliament Conciliation Committee Joint texts

 7